Joseph A. Strohl (born March 19, 1946) is a Wisconsin lobbyist and former Majority Leader of the Wisconsin State Senate.  He represented Racine County as a Democrat from 1979 through 1991.

Biography

Joseph Strohl was born on March 19, 1946, in Evanston, Illinois. He graduated from high school in Stephenson, Michigan, received his B.S. from Northern Michigan University and attended graduate school at the University of Wisconsin–Milwaukee. Strohl is married with one child and one stepchild. He worked as a teacher before entering politics.

Political career
Strohl began his political career working as a legislative aide to Congressman Les Aspin, (WI-01), from 1971 to 1978.

In 1978, Strohl challenged 14-year incumbent Wisconsin Senator Henry Dorman in the 21st District Senate Primary.  Dorman had been indicted earlier in the year for misuse of state telephone credit cards, and was plagued by other controversies, including a nepotism scandal. Strohl's opponent in the 1978 general election was Sister Michelle Olley, the President of the Racine Unified School Board and a Catholic nun.  Olley had been embroiled in a contentious, months-long teachers strike in 1977 which lead to dozens of arrests. Strohl defeated Olley in the general election, held November 7, 1978.  He was re-elected in 1982 and 1986, ultimately serving twelve years in the Senate, including four years as Senate Majority Leader.

In 1989, Strohl ran into controversy when, as Majority Leader, he prevented a parental consent bill from coming to a vote on the Senate floor.  This was exploited in the 1990 election by Strohl's opponent, Racine Unified School Board Member George Petak.  Strohl went on to lose that election, held November 6, 1990.  Petak took office in 1991, the first time a Republican had held the 21st district senate seat since Edward F. Hilker died in office in 1949.

Since leaving the Senate, Strohl has worked as a lobbyist in Madison.

Electoral history

| colspan="6" style="text-align:center;background-color: #e9e9e9;"| Primary Election

| colspan="6" style="text-align:center;background-color: #e9e9e9;"| General Election

| colspan="6" style="text-align:center;background-color: #e9e9e9;"| Primary Election

| colspan="6" style="text-align:center;background-color: #e9e9e9;"| General Election

| colspan="6" style="text-align:center;background-color: #e9e9e9;"| Primary Election

| colspan="6" style="text-align:center;background-color: #e9e9e9;"| General Election

| colspan="6" style="text-align:center;background-color: #e9e9e9;"| Primary Election

| colspan="6" style="text-align:center;background-color: #e9e9e9;"| General Election

References

External links
The Political Graveyard

People from Evanston, Illinois
People from Menominee County, Michigan
Democratic Party Wisconsin state senators
Northern Michigan University alumni
University of Wisconsin–Milwaukee alumni
1946 births
Living people